Pethia nankyweensis is a species of cyprinid fish found in Myanmar where it is known from smaller streams in the area of Myitkyina.  This species reaches a length of  SL.

References 

Pethia
Fish described in 2008
Barbs (fish)